Bearley railway station  serves the village of Bearley in South Warwickshire, England. It is on the Leamington–Stratford line. Today it is an unstaffed rural halt, managed by West Midlands Railway.

Bearley was once a junction station (a branch line to Alcester met the Stratford-upon-Avon to Hatton line here). The station dates from 1860, when it opened as part of the Stratford on Avon Railway's Hatton to Stratford branch line  - the Alcester branch was added in 1876, but this closed in 1951.  Originally a single track station, the line was doubled in 1939 and a second platform built; it reverted to its current status in 1969 when the line was reduced to single track once more.

Facilities
Bearley station is unstaffed. Tickets must be purchased from the senior conductor or train manager on the train.

There is a small parking area available by the station entrance. Parking is free for rail users.

Step free access is available between the entrance and the platform.

Services

Chiltern Railways 

West Midlands Railway
Passengers wishing to alight must inform the senior conductor of their intention to alight prior to departure at the previous station. Passengers wishing to board the train must show a clear hand signal to the driver once the train is in sight. These services mainly run during the weekday morning and evening peak and on Saturday morning and evening. All other West Midlands Railway services pass through without stopping.

There is no Sunday service at Bearley.

References

External links

The Railways of Warwickshire: Bearley station
Rail Around Birmingham and the West Midlands: Bearley railway station

Railway stations in Warwickshire
DfT Category F2 stations
Former Great Western Railway stations
Railway stations in Great Britain opened in 1860
Railway stations served by Chiltern Railways
Railway stations served by West Midlands Trains
Railway request stops in Great Britain